Bala Turkvision Song Contest 2015 was the first (and to date, only) edition of the Bala Turkvision Song Contest. It was initially scheduled to take place in Mary, Turkmenistan, however, it was moved to Istanbul, Turkey. The contest is the junior equivalent of the Turkvision Song Contest; similar to the Junior Eurovision Song Contest being the younger equivalent of the Eurovision Song Contest.

Thirteen countries and regions competed. Eligible to participate are Turkic regions, which have either a large Turkic population or a widely spoken Turkic language. The final took place on the 15 December 2015. Contestants must be aged between 8 and 15 and must perform in a Turkic language.

Origins

Bala Turkvision was an annual song contest. Based on the similar format of the Junior Eurovision Song Contest, Bala Turkvision focused primarily on participating Turkic countries and regions. A juror from each nation awarded between 1 and 10 points for every entry, except their own. In the Grand Final the jury determined the winner.  Unlike the Junior Eurovision Song Contest in which the winning country proceeds to host the following year's event, hosting of the Bala Turkvision Song Contest took place in the country or region that is also hosting the Turkish Capital of Culture.

Location
It was announced on 7 June 2015, that the inaugural Bala Turkvision Song Contest will be held in Mary, Turkmenistan. However, it was later confirmed that the competition had been moved to Istanbul, Turkey. The final took place on 15 December 2015.

Participating countries and regions
The following Turkic regions and ethnic groups competed in the inaugural contest that took place in December 2015.

Scoreboard
Nuray Rahman and Ahmed Amirli who represented Azerbaijan with the song "Cocukluk Yillari", was declared the winner after all the votes had been cast from all of the thirteen participating countries and regions.

10 points

International broadcasts and voting

Commentators
None of the participating broadcasters did broadcast the contest live. However some broadcasters have announced their plans for the broadcasting:  

  Azerbaijan – ATV - 5 January 2016 at 21:40 (CET 18:40)
  Gagauzia – GRT Television
  Georgia – Marmueli Television
  Kazakhstan – Khabar TV – 18 December at 16:15 (10:15 CET)
  Kyrgyzstan – KTRK
  Macedonia – MRT 2
  Turkey – TMB TV - 20 December at 18:00 (17:00 CET)
  Ukraine - Yuzhnaya Volna TV

Other regions
  Bashkortostan —  On 30 November it was announced that Bashkortostan would not debut at the contest due to the current state of international relations between the Russian Federation and Turkey. Despite this Bashkortostan did select Galisar Baiguskarova to represent them in 2015.
  Crimea —  On 7 December it was announced that Crimea would not debut at the contest due to the current state of international relations between the Russian Federation and Turkey. Despite this Crimea did select Aliie Bekirova with the song "Amanim yarim" (On my half) to represent them in 2015.
  Kabardino-Balkaria &  Karachay-Cherkessia —  On 7 December it was announced that Kabardino-Balkaria & Karachay-Cherkessia would not debut at the contest due to the current state of international relations between the Russian Federation and Turkey.
  Khakassia —  On 30 November it was announced that Khakassia would not debut at the contest due to the current state of international relations between the Russian Federation and Turkey. Despite this Khakassia did select Katya Kyzlasova to represent them in 2015.
  Kumyk —  On 7 December it was announced that Kumyk would not debut at the contest due to the current state of international relations between the Russian Federation and Turkey.  Despite this Kumyk did select Karim Salavatov to represent them in 2015.
  Moscow —  On 7 December it was announced that Moscow would not debut at the contest due to the current state of international relations between the Russian Federation and Turkey. Despite this Moscow did select Angeline Gafarovoy to represent them in 2015.
  Stavropol Krai —  On 3 December it was announced that Stavropol Krai would not debut at the contest due to the current state of international relations between the Russian Federation and Turkey. Despite this Stavropol Krai did select Madina Kartakeyva with the song "Altin Ordam" (My golden horde) to represent them in 2015.
  Tatarstan —  On 7 December it was announced that Tatarstan would not debut at the contest due to the current state of international relations between the Russian Federation and Turkey. Despite this Tatarstan did select Saida Mukhametzyanova to represent them in 2015.
  Tuva —  On 30 November it was announced that Tuva would not debut at the contest due to the current state of international relations between the Russian Federation and Turkey. Despite this Tuva did select Aykis to represent them in 2015.
  Uzbekistan —  On 15 December it was announced that Uzbekistan would not debut at the contest for unknown reasons. Despite this Uzbekistan did select Yasmina Garibova to represent them in 2015.

The following list of countries were announced as competing at the contest and appeared on a provisional participation list on 23 September 2015. However, they did not appear on the finalised list in December 2015.

  Bosnia and Herzegovina
  Bulgaria
  Dagestan
  Germany
  Iraq
  Moldova
  Northern Cyprus
  Turkmenistan

See also
ABU Radio Song Festival 2015
ABU TV Song Festival 2015
Eurovision Song Contest 2015
Eurovision Young Dancers 2015
Junior Eurovision Song Contest 2015
Turkvision Song Contest 2015

References

2015 in Turkey
2015
2015 song contests
December 2015 events in Turkey